Slikkerveer is a village in the municipality of Ridderkerk, Netherlands. In 2004, 8550 people lived in Slikkerveer. It is located about 6 km east-southeast of the city of Rotterdam

External links

Ridderkerk
Populated places in South Holland